Saqar Juqak (also Romanized as Saqar Jūqak and Seqer Jūqak; also known as Saghar Joogh and Seqer Jūq) is a village in Farmahin Rural District, in the Central District of Farahan County, Markazi Province, Iran. At the 2006 census, its population was 91, in 25 families.

References 

Populated places in Farahan County